Shawnessy is a suburban residential neighbourhood in the southwest quadrant of Calgary, Alberta. It is bounded by Shawnessy Boulevard to the north, MacLeod Trail to the east, 162 Avenue S to the south and James McKevitt Road to the west.

Shawnessy was established in 1981. It is represented in the Calgary City Council by the Ward 13 councillor.

It is served by the Shawnessy station of the C-Train LRT system. Shawnessy Town Centre is a regional shopping area located east of the community.

Demographics

Residents in this community had a median household income of $72,687 in 2000, and there were 6.7% low income residents living in the neighbourhood. As of 2000, 16.7% of the residents were immigrants. A proportion of 6.1% of the buildings were condominiums or apartments, and 5.7% of the housing was used for renting.

Education
The community is served by Father Doucet Elementary School (Calgary Catholic School Board) and Janet Johnstone Elementary public school (Calgary Board of Education). A middle school named Samuel W. Shaw School (Calgary Board of Education) also serves the community.

See also
List of neighbourhoods in Calgary

References

External links
Shawnessy Community Center Association

Neighbourhoods in Calgary